Strut is the tenth studio album by American rock musician Lenny Kravitz. It was released on September 23, 2014 and was the first release on Kravitz's own Roxie Records, with distribution by Kobalt Label Services. The record also produced five singles released both in 2014 and 2015.

Background
This album is his first one released by his own label Roxie Records—named after his mother, actress Roxie Roker. In an interview for Huffington Post Kravitz explained that the name Strut is "...about being proud and confident about who you are. Whatever you are. Because we’re all different. We’re all freaks of some sort. That whole thing about being "normal," I don't even know what that is. We’re all different. That's the beauty of life. It's about embracing who you are, and walking tall and proud". He also mentioned that "the music itself is about love and relationships", "grit and glamour, all together", and "a lot of sensuality".

Kravitz wrote all the songs on the album, except for "Ooo Baby Baby" written by Smokey Robinson and Warren "Pete" Moore, and played various instruments as well. He decided to cover "Ooo Baby Baby" while filming The Hunger Games: Catching Fire where he played character Cinna, the stylist to Jennifer Lawrence's heroine. He heard it in a makeup trailer, and the song pleased him so much that he soon decided to include it as twelfth title for the new album. The lead single, "The Chamber", was released on June 24, 2014. The video is set in Paris, a city where Kravitz has been living on and off for the past nine years. In 2011, he was even awarded the France's highest cultural honour—Order of Arts and Letters.

Critical reception

At Metacritic, which assigns a weighted mean rating out of 100 to reviews from mainstream critics, the album received an average score of 71, based on five reviews, which indicates "generally favorable reviews". 
Strut was ranked No. 35 on Rolling Stone'''s 50 Best Albums of 2014 list: the song "New York City" was described as "the best tune Mick Jagger didn't get around to writing in his Studio 54 days".

Shane Gilchrist of Otago Daily Times stated "All his technical ability aside, Kravitz lingers a little too long in a comfortable late-night lounge, swaggering around a framework of riff-rock, reconstituted funk and dirty soul. In short, Strut offers no significant U-turns (unlike previous album Black and White America) nor does it stumble". Lisa Nash of Cryptic Rock mentioned "His albums are like a bag of pick and mix: full of variety, sweet to taste, and will make listeners remember their childhood with fondness. The tracks are generally radio and club friendly and will make people want to dance. The guitar riffs will please the Rock fans, while the Soul fans will love Kravitz’s distinctive voice. Strut is a very solid piece of work and, while not as strong as 2011’s Black and White America, will still please Kravitz’s dedicated followers".

Stephen Thomas Erlewine of AllMusic wrote "Kravitz deploys all his considerable sonic skills on songs that are purposefully trashy and unapologetically fun and the result is pure pleasure". A reviewer of Funkatopia said "The new album Strut'' from Lenny Kravitz seems like a culmination of raw rock and funk thrown into a blender... His talent and delivery are intense, but there's something here that seems like we’re looking at a puzzle that had some pieces left out. Maybe it's one of those albums that insist on multiple listens to truly embrace what's happening and maybe those awkward feelings are the subconscious identifying great songs".

Track listing

Personnel
 Lenny Kravitz – lead and background vocals, electric and acoustic guitars, Mellotron, bass, drums, chimes, hand claps, Arp string ensemble, wine glasses, mini-moog
 Craig Ross – acoustic and electric guitars, handclaps
 James "D. Train" Williams – background vocals
 Cindy Mizelle – background vocals
 Tawatha Agee – background vocals
 Dave Baron – synthesizer programming
 Harold Todd – saxophone
 Ludovic Louis – trumpet
 Darret Adkins – cello
 David Bowlin – violin
 Kenji Bunch – viola
 Mali Hunter – handclaps
 Woody Harrelson – handclaps
 Kenyea Johnson – handclaps
 Mia Ross – handclaps
 Rodney Burns – handclaps
 Mathieu Bitton – handclaps
 Ryan Price – handclaps
 Tom Kartsotis – handclaps
 Tom Edmonds – recording engineer
 Bob Clearmountain – handclaps, mixing
 Bob Ludwig – mastering

Charts

Weekly charts

Year-end charts

References

External links

2014 albums
Lenny Kravitz albums
Albums produced by Lenny Kravitz